The NWA United States Tag Team Championship was a professional wrestling tag team championship in Gulf Coast Championship Wrestling (GCCW). A secondary title after the NWA Gulf Coast Tag Team Championship, it was one of many U.S. tag team championships recognized by the National Wrestling Alliance. It was unified with the NWA United States Tag Team Championship (Tri-State version) on April 15, 1974.

Some reigns were held by champions using a ring name, while others used their real name. There have been a total of 37 recognized individual champions and 25 recognized teams, who have had a combined 39 official reigns. The first champions were The Dirty Daltons (Jack Dalton and Jim Dalton), and the final champions were "Cowboy" Bob Kelly and Rocket Monroe. At 300 days, The Dirty Daltons' first reign was the longest, while the team of Mike Boyette and The Wrestling Pro's second reign was the shortest, at less than one day.

The team with the most reigns is The Dalton Brothers (Jack Dalton and Frank Dalton) with five. Mike Boyette has the most individual reigns with seven. The following is a chronological list of teams that have been United States Tag Team Champions by ring name.

Key

Title history

List of top combined reigns

By team

By wrestler

Footnotes

See also

List of National Wrestling Alliance championships

References
General

Specific

External links
NWA United States Tag Team Championship (Gulf Coast version) at Cagematch.net
NWA United States Tag Team Championship (Gulf Coast version) at Wrestlingdata.com

National Wrestling Alliance championships
Tag team wrestling championships
United States professional wrestling championships